The New Albany-Floyd County Consolidated School Corporation (NAFCS) is a school district serving New Albany and Floyd County in Indiana, in the Louisville metropolitan area. The district headquarters are in New Albany.

Schools
High schools:
 Floyd Central High School (Floyds Knobs, unincorporated area)
 New Albany High School (New Albany)

Middle schools:
 Hazelwood Middle School (New Albany)
 Highland Hills Middle School (unincorporated area, near Georgetown)
 Scribner Middle School (New Albany)

Elementary schools:
 Fairmont Elementary School (New Albany)
 Floyd Knobs Elementary School (Floyds Knobs)
 Georgetown Elementary School (Georgetown)
 Grant Line Elementary School (unincorporated area, near New Albany)
 Green Valley Elementary School (New Albany)
 Greenville Elementary School (Greenville)
 Mt. Tabor Elementary School (New Albany)
 S. Ellen Jones Elementary School (New Albany)
 Slate Run Elementary School (New Albany)

Pre-Kindergarten:
 Early Learning Center (New Albany)

Other schools:
 Prosser Career Center (New Albany)
 Virtual Academy (closed)

Highland Hills Middle School dress code controversy
On August 28, 2019, Highland Hills Middle School's principal, Wendy Ivey, told a female student that the student was not allowed to wear a T-shirt with the text "Why be racist, sexist, homophobic, or transphobic when you can just be quiet?" Administrators called it disruptive. Dozens of students protested. The student went home with her parents rather than change or cover up the shirt.

See also 

 List of school districts in Indiana
 Floyd County, Indiana

References

External links
 New Albany-Floyd County Consolidated School Corporation

Education in Floyd County, Indiana
School districts in Indiana